Aapo Heikkilä (born 13 April 1994) is a Finnish professional footballer who plays for AC Oulu, as a forward.

References

1994 births
Living people
Finnish footballers
Haukiputaan Pallo players
AC Oulu players
Rovaniemen Palloseura players
Veikkausliiga players
Ykkönen players
Kakkonen players
Association football forwards
People from Haukipudas
Sportspeople from North Ostrobothnia